Lycée Français de Caracas is a French international school in the Campo Claro area of Caracas, Venezuela. The school serves levels TPS through lycée (senior high school).

The Liceo Pascal first opened on 15 September 1952.

References

External links
  Lycée Français de Caracas

International schools in Caracas
Caracas
Educational institutions established in 1952
1952 establishments in Venezuela